Joshua Nathan (born 25 September 1999) is a British artistic gymnast. Born in Nottingham, his parents moved to Birmingham when he was 11 to pursue gymnastics. In 2016 at the 2016 European Men's Artistic Gymnastics Championships he was part of the British team which won gold in the Junior Competition alongside Joe Fraser and Giarnni Regini-Moran. In the 2019 FIG Artistic Gymnastics World Cup series he won the gold medals for pommel horse in the Szombathely and Paris events. At the 2021 World Artistic Gymnastics Championships he qualified for individual all-around and pommel horse finals. He placed 9th in the all-around final and 6th in the pommel horse final.

Competitive history

References 

Living people
1999 births
British male artistic gymnasts
Sportspeople from Nottingham